7thGarden (stylized as 7thGARDEN) is a Japanese manga series written and illustrated by Mitsu Izumi. It was serialized in Shueisha's Jump Square from August 2014 to March 2017. It was later announced that the manga would be moved to the Jump SQ. website. However, no new chapter has been released since then. In North America, the series is licensed for English language release by Viz Media.

Publication
7thGarden is written and illustrated by Mitsu Izumi. It was serialized in Shueisha's Jump Square from August 4, 2014, to March 4, 2017. In March 2017, it was announced that the manga would be moved to the Jump SQ. website starting on May 2, 2017. However, it was later announced that it would began on June 2, 2017. Nevertheless, the chapter was not released on that date and no new chapter has been released since then. Shueisha has collected its chapters into individual tankōbon volumes. The first volume was released on December 4, 2014. As of May 2, 2017, eight volumes have been released.

In North America, the series is licensed for English language release by Viz Media.

Volume list

See also
Magus of the Library, another manga series by the same author

References

Further reading

External links
 

Action anime and manga
Dark fantasy anime and manga
Romance anime and manga
Shōnen manga
Shueisha manga